Gods of War is Blasphemy's second full-length album, released in 1993. The 1989 demo Blood Upon the Altar has been released as bonus on most of the editions of this album, to compensate for the albums overly short running time. All songs were composed by Blasphemy.

Track listing

Personnel

Blasphemy
Caller Of The Storms – lead guitars, effects 
Ace Gustapo Necrosleezer And Vaginal Commands – bass, backing vocals, effects 
Nocturnal Grave Desecrator And Black Winds – vocals 
3 Black Hearts Of Damnation And Impurity – drums

Production
Len Osanic – engineering
Jeff Trebilcock – engineering
SV. Bell Illustration – artwork
Osmose – executive production

Release history

References

External links
 

1993 albums
Blasphemy (band) albums
Osmose Productions albums